Hoplophractis is a genus of moths of the family Brachodidae. There is only one species in this genus: Hoplophractis heptachalca, that is a dayflying moth known from Óbidos, Pará, Brazil and from Trinidad & Tobago.

Its wingspan is 11–12 mm and it is on wing from August to October.

Biology
Known host plant of this species is Clidemia hirta (Melastomataceae).

References

Brachodidae